Verkhnetulomsky is an urban locality (an urban-type settlement) in Kolsky District of Murmansk Oblast, Russia, located on the Kola Peninsula on the upper Tuloma River,  southwest of Murmansk. Population: 

It was founded as a work settlement around 1961.

References

Urban-type settlements in Murmansk Oblast
Kolsky District